"The Wizard" is a song by British musician Paul Hardcastle, best known as the theme tune for the BBC's weekly music chart show Top of the Pops, which was used from 3 April 1986 to 26 September 1991. Later in 1986, the song was released as a single and charted at No. 15 in the UK charts, leading to Hardcastle also performing the song on the show. In Ireland, it was a top ten hit, peaking at No. 10.

Track listing
UK 12" - "The Wizard (Extended Version)"
A. "Part 1 (Extended Version)" - 4:47
B. "Part 2 (Extended Version)" - 4:47

UK 12" - "The Wizard (Jazz Mix)"
A. "The Wizard (Jazz Mix)" - 4:22
B1. "Part 1 (Extended Version)" - 4:47
B2. "Part 2 (Extended Version)" - 4:47

UK 7"
A. The Wizard (Part 1) - 3:22
B. The Wizard (Part 2) - 3:48

Charts

References

1986 songs
1986 singles
Paul Hardcastle songs
Chrysalis Records singles
Song recordings produced by Paul Hardcastle
Music television series theme songs
Top of the Pops
Songs about wizards